Habashi (also Romanized as Ḩabashī) is a village in Gavrud Rural District, in the Central District of Sonqor County, Kermanshah Province, Iran. At the 2006 census, its population was 279, in 63 families.

References 

Populated places in Sonqor County